Pentucket Regional High School (often abbreviated as "PRHS") is a public high school in West Newbury, Massachusetts, United States, which serves the communities of Groveland, Merrimac, and West Newbury. It is the only high school in the Pentucket Regional School District. As of 2018, the school's principal is Jonathan P. Seymour and assistant principals are Daniel E. Thornton, who is also the athletic director, and Frank Kowalski.

Athletics
Pentucket High School is a member of the Cape Ann League and is a Division III competitor in the Massachusetts Interscholastic Athletic Association. Sports teams are known as the Panthers (previously known as the Sachems). The school colors are green, white, and black. The school's main athletic rival is Triton Regional High School of nearby Byfield, against whom Pentucket plays football on Thanksgiving Day. Pentucket offers sports in the fall, winter, and spring seasons.

Sports:

Fall
Cheerleading
Cross Country (Boys) 
Cross Country (Girls)
Field Hockey 
Football
Golf (co-op with Georgetown)
Soccer (Boys)
Soccer (Girls)
Volleyball Co-op
Winter
Basketball (Boys)
Basketball (Girls)
Cheerleading
Ice Hockey (Boys) (co-op with Georgetown)
Ice Hockey (Girls) (co-op with North Andover and hosted by Haverhill) - competing in the Merrimack Valley Conference
Indoor Track (Boys)
Indoor Track (Girls)
Wrestling
Spring
Baseball
Lacrosse (Boys)
Lacrosse (Girls)
Softball
Tennis (Boys)
Tennis (Girls)
Track & Field (Boys)
Track & Field (Girls)

Graduation requirements
In order to graduate from Pentucket Regional High School, a total of 105 credits must be earned, including the successful completion of the following categories:

References

Cape Ann League
Educational institutions established in 1954
Schools in Essex County, Massachusetts
Public high schools in Massachusetts
Groveland, Massachusetts
West Newbury, Massachusetts
1954 establishments in Massachusetts